is a fictional character in The Tale of Genji (Genji Monogatari). She is the mother of Genji. The Emperor favored her over all his other ladies, despite her relatively lower rank.  He would stay with her longer than was generally considered "proper" and with the court's concern for propriety it was quite scandalous.  The other ladies began to harass her and she began to waste away. She died three years after Genji's birth. After her death, Genji constantly sought to fill the void left by this loss by forming relationships with various women, many of whom resembled his mother.

The Tale of Genji
Fictional emperors and empresses